The Grand Princess of Tuscany was the spouse of the Grand Prince of Tuscany, heir to the Tuscan throne.

Grand Princess of Tuscany

House of Medici

See also

List of Tuscan consorts

 
House of Medici
Grand Duchesses of Tuscany